Antonio López-Istúriz White (born 1 April 1970) is a Spanish politician and Member of the European Parliament (MEP) from Spain. He is a member of the People's Party, member party of the European People's Party. He has served as the Secretary General of the European People's Party since March 2002 till May 2022.

He is also a member of the executive committee of the Spanish People's Party and member of the Committee of Rights and Guarantees, Executive Secretary of the Centrist Democrat International and Secretary-Treasurer of the Wilfried Martens Centre for European Studies, the think-tank of the EPP.

Early life and education

López-Istúriz was born in Pamplona, Navarre, to a Spanish father and an American mother. When he was still a child, his family moved to Palma de Mallorca, Balearic Islands, where they still live.

In his youth, he moved to Madrid to study law at the CEU San Pablo Catholic University, where he also received a degree in economic studies. He later studied at IESE Business School of the University of Navarra.

Aside from native-level Catalan and Spanish, he also speaks English, French, and Italian.

Political career
During his years at the university, he began his involvement in politics by becoming a member of Nuevas Generaciones, the youth organization of the People’s Party.

Between 1996 and 1997 he worked as coordinator of the education and culture section of the People’s Party in the Autonomous Community of Madrid.

In 1997 he moved to Brussels to work as an assistant to the People’s Party delegation at the European Parliament until 1999, when he was called by the President of the Spanish Government at the time José María Aznar to become his political assistant.

In 2002 he returned to Brussels as Secretary-General of the European People’s Party. Two years later he was elected Member of the European Parliament (MEP) running on the lists of Partido Popular.

Member of the European Parliament

First term 2004-2009 
In his first term as MEP he was a member of the Legal Affairs Committee and a substitute member of the Transport Committee, as well as a member of the ACP-EU Parliamentary Assembly, a substitute in the Foreign Affairs Committee and a substitute in the Delegation for relations with Albania, Bosnia Herzegovina and Serbia - Montenegro.

He undertook an arduous defense of the insularity of the Balearic Islands, tourism and peripheral regions.

During this term, López-Istúriz, was the MEP who received the most visitor groups, including university students, entrepreneurs, young people and retirees.

Second term 2009-2014 
Re-elected Member of the European Parliament in 2009, he continued to work as a member of the Legal Affairs Committee and as a substitute in the Foreign and Transport Affairs Committee as well as a member of the ACP-EU Parliamentary Assembly, a substitute in the Subcommittee on Security and Defense and in the delegation for relations with the countries of South-East Europe and for relations with the United States.

Third term 2014-2019 
In the 2014 elections he was re-elected for a third term. He was a member of the Internal Market and Consumer Protection Committee, as well as a substitute on the Foreign Affairs Committee, subcommittee on Security and Defence, delegation to Relations with Israel, delegation for relations with the United States and the delegation of the Parliamentary Assembly for the Union for the Mediterranean. In 2014, he was elected President of the Parliamentary Group of Friends European Union-United Arab Emirates. 

López-Istúriz was rapporteur on the proposal for a Regulation of the European Parliament and of the council on cableway installations, and alternative rapporteur for the report on EU-China relations and on reports for which the Parliament issues an opinion "Establish a new agreement for energy consumers" and "European Energy Security Strategy". He was also alternative rapporteur on Cyber Defense and on Political Cooperation with Singapore.

Fourth term 2019- 
Following the 2019 elections he was re-elected for a fourth term. Currently, he is a member of the Foreign Affairs Committee and Chairman of the  Delegation for the Relations with Israel. He is also member of the Delegation for Relations with the Arab Peninsula as well as substitute in the subcommittee on Security and Defense and the delegation for relations with the United States. He will continue in his role as President of the Parliamentary Group of Friends European Union-United Arab Emirates. These responsibilities will enable him to work on promoting good relations with the Middle East from a global perspective. In addition, he will continue to be heavily involved defending children rights as he has done since first being elected as an MEP. He is also vice-chair of the Intergroup on Children’s Rights in the European Parliament.

European People's Party 
Antonio López-Istúriz is the Secretary General of the European People's Party (EPP). He was elected to this position in 2002 in Estoril on an interim basis and confirmed at the 2004 Brussels Congress, being re-elected at the 2006 Rome, Bonn 2009, Bucharest 2012 and Madrid 2015 Congresses.

During the last statutory congress held on October 21 and 22, 2015 in Madrid, López-Istúriz was re-elected Secretary General for the fourth time in the presence of more than 3,000 participants, 750 delegations, 850 delegates, 14 heads of State and Government and eleven European commissioners. Among those attending the Congress were the German Chancellor Angela Merkel, the Prime Minister of Ireland, Enda Kenny or the Prime Minister of Norway, Erna Solberg, as well as the presidents of the European Commission, Jean-Claude Juncker, and the European Council, Donald Tusk.

IDC-CDI 
In 2002, under the leadership of the President of the Government of Spain at the time, José María Aznar, he was elected Executive Secretary of the Centrist Democratic International  (IDC-CDI)), which brings together 100 political parties from 49 countries. He continues to hold this position, working with the current President of the organization, the former President of Colombia, Andrés Pastrana.

IDC-CDI maintains his commitment to the defense of democracy and the denunciation of violations of Human Rights, particularly in Cuba, Venezuela and Nicaragua. The IDC regularly produces declarations and consensus documents, addressing the defense of Human Rights and the promotion of democracy at an international level.

Defense of children's rights
Antonio López-Istúriz White is vice-president of ANAR Foundation. In its efforts to support children, López-Istúriz helped to promote the Helpline for Children and Adolescents to cover the whole of Spain. In 2015 he became "Champion of Children's Rights" for his work and commitment to the rights of children. He was also one of the promoters of the Written Declaration on Investing in Children which was approved on December 7, 2015, with 428 signatures from MEPs, a record number in the European Parliament. http://www.childrightsmanifesto.eu/

Defense rights of the disabled and the elderly 
Since 2000, he has been Vocal of the Board of Trustees of the AEQUITAS Foundation, an organization created by the General Council of the Spanish Notaries in order to provide free legal services to people who for reasons of age, physical or mental illness, or membership of certain socially-disadvantaged groups, are in need of special protection. Within the scope of his parliamentary activity, he was rapporteur of the European Parliament report that addressed issues such as vulnerability in old age and measures to support the elderly and disabled.

Transatlantic relations 
López-Istúriz has always been involved in trans-Atlantic relations, As a member of the respective delegation in the European Parliament and also as Secretary-General of the European People’s Party, he travels frequently to the United States and holds meetings with politicians and other civil society actors In July 2018, he spoke in front of the Republican Study Committee (RSC), a caucus of conservative members of the Republican Party in the United States House of Representatives.

Besides holding several meetings with late Senator McCain, who was also the president of the International Republican Institute, López-Istúriz has met with republicans such as Senator Marco Rubio and congressmen Paul Ryan, Chris Smith, Ileana Ros-Lehtinen and Mario Díaz-Balart. Along with the latest two and with former congressman Lincoln Díaz-Balart, he has developed initiatives and activities in favor of Cuban democracy, a subject about which he is extremely passionate.

He has also met democrat representatives, such as congressman Albio Sires and congresswoman Debbie Wasserman-Schultz, a number of Presidents of the Democratic National Committee, and with some advisors of the President Obama such as Rick Holtzapple (who was Head of European Affairs of the White House), Mike Froman (Obama’s advisor for security affairs) and Miriam Sapiro (Responsible for commerce affairs at the Obama´s Administration). In 2016, he attended the Democratic National Convention in Philadelphia  witnessing  the nomination of Hillary Clinton.

Other topics of intertest

Latin America

López-Istúriz has always been very active in the promotion of democracy in Cuba and Venezuela, and has been vocal in his support for Cuban dissidents and Venezuelan opposition.

Self-employed workers 
López-Istúriz has been a committed advocate in favor of the self-employed,. Throughout his career he has highlighted the importance of self-employed workers and entrepreneurs to generate growth and employment.

Distinctions and awards 
2014 - Commander of the Order of the Star (Italy)

2013 - Parliamentarian Prize - MEP of the Year - awarded by Spanish Parliamentarian Journalists Association

2002 - Officer of the Order of Bernardo O'Higgins (Chile)

2000 - Recipient of the Order of the Star (Jordan)

References

External links

 
 

1970 births
Living people
MEPs for Spain 2004–2009
MEPs for Spain 2009–2014
MEPs for Spain 2014–2019
MEPs for Spain 2019–2024
People's Party (Spain) MEPs
Spanish people of American descent